Obeng is a surname. Notable people with the surname include:

Curtis Obeng (born 1989), English footballer
Eddie Obeng (born 1959), British educator and writer
Ernest Obeng (born 1956), Ghanaian sprinter
Evans Obeng (born 1998), Ghanaian professional footballer
Francis Obeng (born 1986) Ghanaian footballer
James Kojo Obeng, Ghanaian politician and teacher
Kwadwo Obeng Junior (born 1999), Ghanaian professional footballer

Letitia Obeng (born 1925), first Ghanaian woman to obtain a degree in zoology and the first to be awarded a doctorate
Michael K. Obeng (born 1973), American plastic surgeon
Paul Victor Obeng (1947–2014), Ghanaian mechanical engineer and politician
Richard Emmanuel Obeng (1877–1951), Ghanaian writer
Richard Obeng (born 1981), Ghanaian politician
Samuel Obeng (born 1997), Ghanaian footballer 
Samuel Obeng (linguist), professor of linguistics at Indiana University
Seth Obeng (born 1945), Ghanaian soldier
William Obeng (born 1983), American football player

Surnames of Akan origin